Franco Bartoni (4 October 1948 – 13 August 2005) was an Italian tennis administrator and former professional player.

Biography
Born in Rome, Bartoni competed on the professional tour in the late 1960s and early 1970s. He was a member of Italy's Davis Cup squad in 1970 and was a singles bronze medalist at that year's University Games in Turin.

When his playing career ended he moved into tennis administration and headed the Italian Tennis Federation from 1976 to 1978. He served as the tournament director of several tournaments during his career, including the Italian Open.

Bartoni spent the final years of his life in San Marino and was in Rome when he died in 2005 following an unsuccessful operative procedure, at the age of 56.

References

External links
 
 

1948 births
2005 deaths
Italian male tennis players
Universiade medalists in tennis
Universiade bronze medalists for Italy
Italian sports executives and administrators
Tennis executives
Tennis players from Rome
Medalists at the 1970 Summer Universiade